UWW TV is a TV station located in Whitewater, Wisconsin that is mainly run by students at the University of Wisconsin –Whitewater. It offers 5 blocks of TV programming that range from news, sports, and original content. Along with UWW TV, University of Wisconsin–Whitewater also offer programs with their local radio station 91.7 The Edge. As of 2015, 55 students participate in the program.



History 

UWW TV used to be known as Cable 6 and then Cable 19 back in the 80's and 90's When it switched over to UWW TV in 2012, the programming mainly switched to student-based projects and student information programming. UWW TV has had two directors over its lifetime. Doctor Conover, who mainly directed from 70's to the early 00's and cemented the foundation of UWW TV, and Jim Mead, who now directs UWW TV and played a pivotal part and in pushing UWW TV into the social media realm. There is 12 hours of the day are new student programming and the other 12 hours are just highlights and compilations of popular broadcasts.

Programming 

UWW TV has five blocks of TV programming that cover original content, news, sports, supplement programing, and public service announcements. Their main form of television is located in “Original Programming” where they highlight horror, comedy, and reality dramas. Their comedy block is the most viewed original programs such as Bob is a Jerk, ECLAP, and Dude Sessions. Recently UWW TV has started a new program on channel 101.1 showing classic sports. Which includes the best of the war hawk sports. This program will air 16 hours a day for seven days a week.

References

University of Wisconsin–Whitewater